Nicolás Hernández Rodríguez (born 18 January 1998) is a Colombian footballer who plays as central defender for Brazilian club Internacional.

Club career
Hernández signed for Athletico Paranaense from Atlético Nacional on 23 August 2021. He won the 2021 Copa Sudamericana with the side, and was also a backup option in their 2022 Copa Libertadores runner-up campaign.

On 23 February 2023, Hernández signed a contract with Internacional until December 2024.

Career statistics

References

External links
Athletico Paranaense profile 

1998 births
Living people
People from Villavicencio
Colombian footballers
Association football defenders
Categoría Primera A players
Categoría Primera B players
Atlético Nacional footballers
Independiente Santa Fe footballers
Campeonato Brasileiro Série A players
Club Athletico Paranaense players
Sport Club Internacional players
Colombian expatriate footballers
Colombian expatriate sportspeople in Brazil
Expatriate footballers in Brazil